Ola Se Sena Ta Vrika is an album by Greek singer Giannis Ploutarhos, released in 2005 by Minos EMI.

Track listing

References

2005 albums
Giannis Ploutarhos albums